Rudi (born 1 June 1987) is an Indonesian professional footballer who plays as a defensive midfielder for Liga 2 club Semen Padang.

Honours

Club
Semen Padang
Indonesia Premier League: 2011-12
 Piala Indonesia runner-up: 2012
 Liga 2 runner-up: 2018

References

External links 
 
 Rudi at Ligaindonesia

1987 births
Living people
Indonesian footballers
Liga 1 (Indonesia) players
Semen Padang F.C. players
Association football midfielders
People from Agam Regency
Sportspeople from West Sumatra